Presidential elections were held in Chile on 22 May 1927, following the resignation of President Emiliano Figueroa. The result was a victory for Interior Minister Carlos Ibáñez del Campo, who ran as an independent and received 98% of the vote.

Electoral system
The election was held using the absolute majority system, under which a candidate had to receive over 50% of the popular vote to be elected. If no candidate received over 50% of the vote, both houses of the National Congress would come together to vote on the two candidates who received the most votes.

Results

References

Presidential elections in Chile
1927 in Chile
Chile
May 1927 events